Kaies Ghodhbane (born 7 January 1976) is a Tunisian former professional footballer who played as midfielder.

He has 92 caps for the national team, and was called up to the 2006 World Cup. He also played at the World Cups in 1998 and 2002. In addition he was on the winning Tunisian team at the 2004 African Cup of Nations, and the team that finished second at the 1996 African Cup of Nations.

Honours
Tunisia
 Africa Cup of Nations: 2004

References

External links

1976 births
Living people
Association football midfielders
Tunisian footballers
Tunisian expatriate footballers
Tunisia international footballers
Footballers at the 1996 Summer Olympics
Olympic footballers of Tunisia
1998 FIFA World Cup players
2002 FIFA World Cup players
2005 FIFA Confederations Cup players
2006 FIFA World Cup players
Étoile Sportive du Sahel players
Baniyas Club players
Diyarbakırspor footballers
Samsunspor footballers
Konyaspor footballers
Expatriate footballers in the United Arab Emirates
Expatriate footballers in Turkey
Süper Lig players
UAE Pro League players
1996 African Cup of Nations players
1998 African Cup of Nations players
2000 African Cup of Nations players
2002 African Cup of Nations players
2004 African Cup of Nations players
2006 Africa Cup of Nations players